Emire Khidayer (born 1971, Piešťany) is a Slovak diplomat, entrepreneur and writer. She authored several radio series and appeared as a guest in  various Arabic, Czech and Slovak television and radio shows. She studied at Comenius University in Bratislava with major in Arabic, English and Islamic studies, and graduated with a doctorate in Arabic studies. Her study in this field continued with scholarship at Ain Shams University in Cairo.

Diplomatic work 
1997 - 2000: Egypt
2001 - 2007: Iraq, Kuwait
2015 - Sudan -  advisor to the main representative of all United Nations agencies.

Entrepreneurship 
managing director of the GCWare Middle East company in Dubai Internet City with reach in  Oman, Saudi Arabia and Syria. Company offers products in the field of traffic informative systems, systems for vehicle parks, solutions regarding safety of pipeline installation and other.
her professional activity in Slovakia included mainly work in the field of IT and telecommunications, currently she also runs a publishing company ROTRA.

Works

Linguistics articles and translations 
Proposal for the Transcription of Arabic Words into Slovak.
translations of Egyptian authors to Slovak

Radio series 
2005 - Radio Twist Bratislava - series Cesta po arabskom svete (Journey via Arab world)
2012
5-parts series of stories Príbehy zo Sumhuramu (Tales from Sumhuram) for Slovak Radio
travel 5-parts series In Arabic for Slovak Radio (Oman, Jemen, Morocco, Sudan, Holidays make us closer)

Books 
 Arabic world - other planet?, in Slovak: Arabský svet – Iná planéta? (2009 a 2012), in Czech: Arabský svět - jiná planeta? (2011)
 Tales from Sumhuram (2012), in Slovak: Príbehy zo Sumhuramu 2010,
 Life in Arabic, in Slovak: Život po arabsky (2010), in Czech: Život po arabsku (2012), in Polish: Zicie po arabsku (2013)
 Dubai secrets, in Slovak: Dubajské tajomstvá, in Czech: Taje Dubaje (both books was published in 2013 in the author's publishing company ROTRAN)

References

External links 
 Oficial homepage

21st-century Slovak women writers
Slovak businesspeople
1971 births
Living people
Slovak women diplomats
21st-century Slovak writers
Comenius University alumni
People from Piešťany